Laureano Márquez (4 July 1963 in Canary Islands), is a Spanish-born Venezuelan humorist and politologist.

Biography
Marquez was born on the Spanish island of Tenerife, one of the Canary Islands, in 1963 and obtained a BA in Political Science from the Central University of Venezuela. As an actor, he has played leading roles on radio and television, such as in Radio Rochela, Humor a Primera Vista, and Que Broma Tan Seria, and has written and performed in several plays, including La Reconstituyente, El Pantaletazo, and Laureamor y Emidilio.

He is a writer of columns for several publications, among them the newspapers El Nacional and Tal Cual. He won the El Mejor Artículo Humorístico prize for best humorous article in 2001. He has written the humorous books, 'Se sufre pero se goza, El Código Bochinche and Amorcito corazón.

Known for his use of satire and  prose to poke fun at Venezuelan politicians, he was fined in 2007 by local courts after writing a sketch based on a dialogue between Hugo Chávez and his younger daughter.

In 2010, he won an International Press Freedom Award from the Committee to Protect Journalists. The award is given for journalists who show courage in defending press freedom in the face of attacks, threats or imprisonment.

See also
List of kidnappings

References

Bibliography

External links
Laureano Márquez Official website

1963 births
Living people
Central University of Venezuela alumni
People from Tenerife
Venezuelan journalists
Kidnapped Venezuelan people
Kidnappings in Venezuela
Venezuelan male comedians
Venezuelan people of Spanish descent
Venezuelan people of Canarian descent